The Campeonato Brasileiro de Futebol Feminino (Brazilian Women's National Championship), also known as Brasileirão Feminino, is an annual Brazilian women's club football tournament organized by the Confederação Brasileira de Futebol, or CBF. It is the country's premier women's football competition and the first professional women's league in the country.

History
Brazil had a tournament called Taça Brasil de Futebol Feminino (Women's Football Brazil Trophy, in English) played between 1983, and 1989, followed by Torneio Nacional (1990 and 1991) and Taça Brasil de Clubes (1993). A competition also named Campeonato Brasileiro de Futebol Feminino which was a forerunner of the current tournament, was founded in 1994, ran that season, was cancelled in 1995 and re-instated in 1996 being played until 2001. When it folded, the country was left with only state football leagues for women available in few states and no national tournament.

In 2006, another national tournament attempt was made, organized by the Amateur Paulista Football Federation (Federação Paulista de Futebol Amador, FPFA) and the National Football League (Liga Nacional de Futebol, LINAF), it was called Taça Brasil de Futebol Feminino. The tournament was contested in Jaguariúna, São Paulo state on its first year (2006) and in multiple towns of Rio de Janeiro state on its second year (2007).

In 2007, CBF created the Copa do Brasil de Futebol Feminino, a national cup tournament, and in 2013, a national league competition was founded, the Campeonato Brasileiro de Futebol Feminino, with a short three-month season initially. In 2015, teams that reached the knock-out stage got a financial support of about USD 3,000 for a home-and-away round plus air or road transport cost paid.

Format
Up to 2016, 20 teams took part in the competition. In the first round there were four groups of five teams that play each other within the group once. The top two of each group move on. In the second round eight teams were put into two groups of four. Teams play each other twice and the top two teams move to the two leg semi-finals, with the winners moving to the two leg final.

In 2017 the league was restructured and the first level, now called Série A1, has 16 teams in one group. After playing each other the top 8 teams move to the play-offs. There is also relegation/promotion to the new Série A2, which will also have 16 teams split in two groups of eight teams. In 2021, the Série A3 was created with 32 teams taking part.

List of winners

Performances

By club

By state

Top scorers

See also
Sport in Brazil
Football in Brazil
Women's football in Brazil
Campeonato Brasileiro Série A2
Campeonato Brasileiro Série A3
Copa do Brasil de Futebol Feminino
Copa Libertadores Femenina

Notes

References

External links
Official website 
soccerway.com, fixtures and results

Campeonato Brasileiro de Futebol Feminino Série A1
Brasileiro de Futebol Feminino
 
Professional sports leagues in Brazil